Ababkovo is the name of several rural localities in Russia:
Ababkovo, Ivanovo Oblast, a village in Sunzha Settlement of Vichugsky District of Ivanovo Oblast; 
Ababkovo, Galichsky District, Kostroma Oblast, a village in Dmitriyevskoye Settlement of Galichsky District in Kostroma Oblast; 
Ababkovo, Kostromskoy District, Kostroma Oblast, a village in Kuznetsovskoye Settlement of Kostromskoy District in Kostroma Oblast; 
Ababkovo, Manturovsky District, Kostroma Oblast, a village in Oktyabrskoye Settlement of Manturovsky District in Kostroma Oblast; 
Ababkovo, Mezhevskoy District, Kostroma Oblast, a village in Georgiyevskoye Settlement of Mezhevskoy District in Kostroma Oblast; 
Ababkovo, Nizhny Novgorod Oblast, a selo in Ababkovsky Selsoviet of Pavlovsky District in Nizhny Novgorod Oblast; 
Ababkovo, Tver Oblast, a village in Pryamukhinskoye Rural Settlement of Kuvshinovsky District in Tver Oblast;

See also